Fool Hollow Lake is a public lake located in Navajo County, Arizona, near the city of Show Low.

Location

Description

Fool Hollow was named for a hapless settler (Thomas Jefferson Adair) who attempted to farm the rocky canyon in the 1880s. The Arizona Game and Fish Department constructed the lake, thereby covering up the community of Adair, in 1957 specifically to provide water-oriented outdoor recreation. It is located within the Fool Hollow Recreation Area, and is cooperatively managed by the Arizona State Parks, the U.S. Forest Service, the Arizona Game and Fish Department and the City of Show Low. It contains self-sustaining populations of Largemouth and Smallmouth Bass, Sunfish, Walleye, Carp, Black Crappie, Channel Catfish and Crayfish. The Arizona Game and Fish Department stocks the lake with Rainbow Trout throughout the spring and summer.

References

External links
 Arizona Boating Locations Facilities Map
 Arizona Fishing Locations Map
Video of Fool Hollow Lake

Reservoirs in Arizona
Reservoirs in Navajo County, Arizona
Apache-Sitgreaves National Forests
Protected areas of Navajo County, Arizona
Ghost towns in Arizona